Indian River High School is the name of several high schools:

Indian River High School (Delaware), Dagsboro, Delaware
Indian River High School (Ohio), Massillon, Ohio
Indian River High School (Chesapeake, Virginia)
Indian River Central High School, Philadelphia, New York
Indian River Charter High School, Vero Beach, Florida

See also 
 Indian River (disambiguation)
 Indian River School District (disambiguation)
 Indian Creek High School (disambiguation)